A round shield can refer to any type of hand-held shield that has a round shape. They come in highly varying sizes, and have, in different forms, been very popular in Europe, the Asia and the Americas, throughout the Bronze Age, the Classical period, the Post-classical period, and the Early Modern period. During the Bronze Age they were generally large and designed for bashing and shield wall tactics (such as Spartan bronze shields), while since the late post-classical they were mostly designed for parrying and riposte (such as the small buckler, supplanted by the heater shield).

Although offering less protection, especially to the legs than the kite shield, the round shield was sometimes used as an offensive weapon. The word "swashbuckler" came from this, as soldiers beat their weapon against the buckler.

List of round shields

Historical
A buckler is a very small round shield popular in the Late Middle Ages and Renaissance.
Scandinavian seafaring warriors of the early medieval period used wooden round shields with centergrips.
Taming, a round shield from the Philippines.
Targe typically referred to a round shield.
The dhal was a round shield in India.
The Romans used the clipeus and parma.

Fictional
Captain America's shield, the primary piece of equipment used defensively and offensively by the comic book superhero Captain America.

Shields